The year 1529 in science and technology included a number of events, some of which are listed here.

Astronomy
 Petrus Apianus publishes Introductio Cosmographiae, cum quibusdam Geometriae ac Astronomiae principiis eam necessariis ad rem in Ingolstadt.

Chemistry
 Fluorine is first described by Georgius Agricola.
 The alchemical text Kunst- und recht Alchämei-Büchlein is published in Worms.

Technology
 Michelangelo is appointed to reconstruct the fortifications of Florence.

Births
 April 3 – Michael Neander, German mathematician (died 1581)
 April 25 – Franciscus Patricius (born Franjo Petriš), Venetian philosopher and scientist of Croatian descent (died 1597)
 December 16 – Laurent Joubert, French physician (died 1582)
 1529 or 1530 – Julius Caesar Aranzi, Bolognese anatomist (died 1589)

Deaths
 Hans von Gersdorff, German surgeon (born c.1455)

References

 
16th century in science
1520s in science